}}
Schlechterella is a genus of plants in the family Apocynaceae (the dogbane family). It is native to Africa, found in Ethiopia, Kenya, Mozambique, Somalia, Tanzania and Uganda.

, the genus contained two species:
 Schlechterella abyssinica (Chiov.) Venter & R.L.Verh.
 Schlechterella africana (Schltr.) K.Schum.

The genus was circumscribed by Karl Moritz Schumann in H.G.A.Engler & K.A.E.Prantl, Nat. Pflanzenfam., Gesamtregister: on page 462 in 1899.

The genus name of Schlechterella is in honour of Friedrich Richard Rudolf Schlechter (1872–1925), who was a German taxonomist, botanist, and author of several works on orchids.

References

Periplocoideae
Apocynaceae genera
Flora of Ethiopia
Flora of Somalia
Flora of East Tropical Africa